Melkus RS 1000 is a sports car produced by Melkus. It is powered by a tuned, mid-mounted 3-cylinder 2-stroke 992 cm3 engine, similar to the one in the Wartburg 353, and features gull-wing doors. 101 cars were made between 1969 and 1979 in the Dresden factory.

Technical description 
The RS 1000 has a traditional ladder frame and features a body-on-frame design. Being a racecar, it has a roll bar integrated into the windscreen frame and an addition roll bar installed behind the driver's seat. The RS 1000 has independent front and rear suspension, coil springs, stabilisers and drum brakes. The gearbox is a 5-speed  manual; the clutch is the same as in the Barkas B 1000. A specially-tuned version of the water-cooled, two-stroke 992 cm3 AWE353/1 Wartburg engine is used. Unlike the standard, single-carb Wartburg engine, it has three carburettors, as well as a higher compression ratio. This engine produces  at 4500 min−1 and gives a maximum torque of 118 N·m (87 lb ft.) at 3500 min−1. Fibreglass was used as the body material. The top speed is 165 km/h.

After the Wende 
The RS 1000 did not have an immediate successor. However, in time for the 50 year jubilee a limited series of 15 RS 1000 have been made. The first sports car of this series was presented on November 26, 2006. In 2009, the production of the indirect successor, the Melkus RS 2000 began. The production was halted in 2012 when Melkus registered as insolvent.

A Melkus RS 1000 is featured in the music video for ATC's 2000 hit, "Around the World (La La La La La)".

References

External links 

 Melkus homepage

Sports cars
Rear mid-engine, rear-wheel-drive vehicles
Automobiles with gull-wing doors
1960s cars
1970s cars
Goods manufactured in East Germany